The District Department of Transportation (DDOT, stylized as d.) is an agency of the government of the District of Columbia, in the United States, which manages and maintains publicly owned transportation infrastructure in the District of Columbia. DDOT is the lead agency with authority over the planning, design, construction, and maintenance of alleys, bridges, sidewalks, streets, street lights, and traffic signals in the District of Columbia.

History
Historical documents refer to the entity now known as DDOT as the "D.C. Department of Highways" in the 1940s and 50s, and later the "D.C. Department of Highways and Traffic" through the 1960s and early 70s.

In August 1975, the department merged with the Department of Motor Vehicles and the Office of the Mayor's Transportation Systems Coordinator to become the D.C. Division of Transportation, a subunit of the D.C. Department of Public Works (DPW). The division began suffering from significant deficiencies in the 1990s, including an over-reliance on outside contractors, a lack of expertise with which to oversee contractors and ensure performance and quality work, severe understaffing, and excessive lead times for the letting and implementing of design and construction contracts. These issues led to significant backlogs in maintenance and construction, and hundreds of millions of dollars in federal funds were unexpended.

In response to the impending management crisis in its transportation division, in May 2002, the Council of the District of Columbia passed the District Department of Transportation Establishment Act of 2002 (D.C. Law 14-137), which separated the Division of Transportation from the Department of Public Works and created a standalone D.C. Department of Transportation (DDOT). A 2004 assessment indicated that the reorganization led to significant improvements in the District of Columbia's oversight of its transportation infrastructure.

Operations

DDOT is led by a Director who is assisted by a Chief of Staff, Deputy Director for Operations, and Deputy Director for Resource Allocation.

The most recent director was Jeff Marootian, who recently left DDOT to become Special Assistant to the President for Climate and Science Agency Personnel. Five operational departments oversee DDOT's main functions: the Infrastructure Project Management Administration (IPMA), the Mass Transit Administration (MTA), the Transportation Policy & Planning Administration (TPPA), the Transportation Operations Administration (TOA), and the Urban Forestry Administration (UFA). Four administrative offices (Communication, Information Technology, Contracting and Procurement, and Legal) provide managerial support.

DDOT coordinates a number of programs with other city and regional agencies. DDOT shares street and sidewalk snow removal with the Department of Public Works, and coordinates a reduced-fare program for elementary and secondary school students with MetroBus and MetroRail. Because of the heavy regional integration of the District's transportation system with other local, county, state, and federal governments, DDOT's Transportation Policy and Planning Administration coordinates policy with the Washington Metropolitan Area Transit Authority (WMATA) and the Metropolitan Washington Council of Governments' regional transportation planning and policy bodies. DDOT also works closely with the District of Columbia Emergency Management Agency, Metropolitan Washington Council of Governments, the State of Maryland, the Commonwealth of Virginia, and the U.S. federal government to plan and implement the Regional Emergency Coordination Plan (which provides for emergency evacuation of the District of Columbia and surrounding areas in case of a major event, natural disaster, or military or terrorist attack).

DDOT's headquarters is currently located at 55 M Street SE on top of the Navy Yard Metro station.

Funding and current projects

As of 2004, all of the District's bridges and approximately 30 percent of its roads were eligible for funding from the Federal Highway Administration (FHWA). The remaining roads were maintained solely with D.C. government funds.

DDOT is engaged in a number of critical transportation initiatives, many of which focus on economic development in the city's poorer neighborhoods. Among DDOT's major initiatives are:
DC Streetcar - DDOT owns and is currently the sole financier of DC Streetcar, a surface light rail and streetcar network under construction in Washington, D.C.
Great Streets Initiative - DDOT is a lead agency in the District of Columbia's Great Streets Initiative, which seeks to revitalize critical transportation and retail corridors throughout the city to spur economic development. Current Great Streets projects include Brentwood Road NE, H Street NE, Kenilworth Avenue NE, New York Avenue, Pennsylvania Avenue SE, and South Capitol Street.
DC Circulator - DDOT owns the DC Circulator bus system, a downtown circulator bus system. The Washington Metro manages the Circulator's operations, while a contractor (First Transit) operates the system. DDOT and Metro fund the Circulator in cooperation with D.C. Surface Transit Inc. (a nonprofit conglomerate that includes the Downtown Business Improvement District, Georgetown Business Improvement District, Golden Triangle Business Improvement District, Capitol Hill Business Improvement District, Washington Convention Center Authority, and the Washington, D.C. Convention and Tourism Corporation).
11th Street Bridges - DDOT is replacing both spans of the 11th Street Bridges with three new bridges at a cost of $365 million. The project is the biggest construction effort ever undertaken by DDOT.

Statistics
The District Department of Transportation is responsible for:
 of streets
241 bridges
 of sidewalks
 of alleys
144,000 trees adjacent to city streets

Directors

See also
Washington Metropolitan Area Transit Authority

References

External links
District Department of Transportation home page
District Dept. of Transportation site on YouTube

Government of the District of Columbia
Transportation in Washington, D.C.
State departments of transportation of the United States
2002 establishments in Washington, D.C.